The history of calculus is fraught with philosophical debates about the meaning and logical validity of fluxions or infinitesimal numbers. The standard way to resolve these debates is to define the operations of calculus using epsilon–delta procedures rather than infinitesimals. Nonstandard analysis instead reformulates the calculus using a logically rigorous notion of infinitesimal numbers.

Nonstandard analysis originated in the early 1960s by the mathematician Abraham Robinson. He wrote:

... the idea of infinitely small or infinitesimal quantities seems to appeal naturally to our intuition. At any rate, the use of infinitesimals was widespread during the formative stages of the Differential and Integral Calculus. As for the objection ... that the distance between two distinct real numbers cannot be infinitely small, Gottfried Wilhelm Leibniz argued that the theory of infinitesimals implies the introduction of ideal numbers which might be infinitely small or infinitely large compared with the real numbers but which were to possess the same properties as the latter.

Robinson argued that this law of continuity of Leibniz's is a precursor of the transfer principle. Robinson continued:

However, neither he nor his disciples and successors were able to give a rational development leading up to a system of this sort. As a result, the theory of infinitesimals gradually fell into disrepute and was replaced eventually by the classical theory of limits.

Robinson continues:

... Leibniz's ideas can be fully vindicated and ... they lead to a novel and fruitful approach to classical Analysis and to many other branches of mathematics. The key to our method is provided by the detailed analysis of the relation between mathematical languages and mathematical structures which lies at the bottom of contemporary model theory.

In 1973, intuitionist Arend Heyting praised nonstandard analysis as "a standard model of important mathematical research".

Introduction
Ordered fields that have infinitesimal elements are also called non-Archimedean. More generally, nonstandard analysis is any form of mathematics that relies on nonstandard models and the transfer principle. A field that satisfies the transfer principle for real numbers is called a real closed field, and nonstandard real analysis uses these fields as nonstandard models of the real numbers.

Robinson's original approach was based on these nonstandard models of the field of real numbers. His classic foundational book on the subject Nonstandard Analysis was published in 1966 and is still in print. On page 88, Robinson writes:

The existence of nonstandard models of arithmetic was discovered by Thoralf Skolem (1934). Skolem's method foreshadows the ultrapower construction [...]

Several technical issues must be addressed to develop a calculus of infinitesimals. For example, it is not enough to construct an ordered field with infinitesimals. See the article on hyperreal numbers for a discussion of some of the relevant ideas.

Basic definitions
In this section we outline one of the simplest approaches to defining a hyperreal field . Let  be the field of real numbers, and let  be the semiring of natural numbers. Denote by  the set of sequences of real numbers. Take a nonprincipal ultrafilter . In particular,  contains the Fréchet filter. Consider a pair of sequences

Motivation
There are at least three reasons to consider nonstandard analysis: historical, pedagogical, and technical.

Historical
Much of the earliest development of the infinitesimal calculus by Newton and Leibniz was formulated using expressions such as infinitesimal number and vanishing quantity. As noted in the article on hyperreal numbers, these formulations were widely criticized by George Berkeley and others. The challenge of developing a consistent and satisfactory theory of analysis using infinitesimals was first met by Abraham Robinson.

In 1958 Curt Schmieden and Detlef Laugwitz published an article "Eine Erweiterung der Infinitesimalrechnung" ("An Extension of Infinitesimal Calculus") which proposed a construction of a ring containing infinitesimals. The ring was constructed from sequences of real numbers. Two sequences were considered equivalent if they differed only in a finite number of elements. Arithmetic operations were defined elementwise. However, the ring constructed in this way contains zero divisors and thus cannot be a field.

Pedagogical
H. Jerome Keisler, David Tall, and other educators maintain that the use of infinitesimals is more intuitive and more easily grasped by students than the "epsilon–delta" approach to analytic concepts. This approach can sometimes provide easier proofs of results than the corresponding epsilon–delta formulation of the proof. Much of the simplification comes from applying very easy rules of nonstandard arithmetic, as follows:

infinitesimal × finite = infinitesimal

infinitesimal + infinitesimal = infinitesimal

together with the transfer principle mentioned below.

Another pedagogical application of nonstandard analysis is Edward Nelson's treatment of the theory of stochastic processes.

Technical
Some recent work has been done in analysis using concepts from nonstandard analysis, particularly in investigating limiting processes of statistics and mathematical physics. Sergio Albeverio et al. discuss some of these applications.

Approaches to nonstandard analysis
There are two main different approaches to nonstandard analysis: the semantic or model-theoretic approach and the syntactic approach. Both of these approaches apply to other areas of mathematics beyond analysis, including number theory, algebra and topology.

Robinson's original formulation of nonstandard analysis falls into the category of the semantic approach. As developed by him in his papers, it is based on studying models (in particular saturated models) of a theory. Since Robinson's work first appeared, a simpler semantic approach (due to Elias Zakon) has been developed using purely set-theoretic objects called superstructures. In this approach a model of a theory is replaced by an object called a superstructure  over a set . Starting from a superstructure  one constructs another object  using the ultrapower construction together with a mapping  that satisfies the transfer principle. Moreover, it is possible to consider a simpler form of saturation called countable saturation. This simplified approach is also more suitable for use by mathematicians who are not specialists in model theory or logic.

The syntactic approach requires much less logic and model theory to understand and use. This approach was developed in the mid-1970s by the mathematician Edward Nelson. Nelson introduced an entirely axiomatic formulation of nonstandard analysis that he called internal set theory (IST). IST is an extension of Zermelo–Fraenkel set theory (ZF) in that alongside the basic binary membership relation ∈, it introduces a new unary predicate standard, which can be applied to elements of the mathematical universe together with some axioms for reasoning with this new predicate.

Syntactic nonstandard analysis requires a great deal of care in applying the principle of set formation (formally known as the axiom of comprehension), which mathematicians usually take for granted. As Nelson points out, a fallacy in reasoning in IST is that of illegal set formation. For instance, there is no set in IST whose elements are precisely the standard integers (here standard is understood in the sense of the new predicate). To avoid illegal set formation, one must only use predicates of ZFC to define subsets.

Another example of the syntactic approach is the Alternative Set Theory introduced by Petr Vopěnka, trying to find set-theory axioms more compatible with the nonstandard analysis than the axioms of ZF.

Robinson's book
Abraham Robinson's book Nonstandard analysis was published in 1966. Some of the topics developed in the book were already present in his 1961 article by the same title (Robinson 1961). In addition to containing the first full treatment of nonstandard analysis, the book contains a detailed historical section where Robinson challenges some of the received opinions on the history of mathematics based on the pre–nonstandard analysis perception of infinitesimals as inconsistent entities. Thus, Robinson challenges the idea that Augustin-Louis Cauchy's "sum theorem" in Cours d'Analyse concerning the convergence of a series of continuous functions was incorrect, and proposes an infinitesimal-based interpretation of its hypothesis that results in a correct theorem.

Invariant subspace problem
Abraham Robinson and Allen Bernstein used nonstandard analysis to prove that every polynomially compact linear operator on a Hilbert space has an invariant subspace.

Bernstein and Robinson show that if  is polynomially compact, then there is a hyperfinite index  such that the matrix coefficient  is infinitesimal.

Denote by  the polynomial such that  is compact. The subspace  is internal of hyperfinite dimension. Denote by  the projection to the subspace . Now let  be the greatest index such that .

Upon reading a preprint of the Bernstein and Robinson paper, Paul Halmos reinterpreted their proof using standard techniques. Both papers appeared back-to-back in the same issue of the Pacific Journal of Mathematics. Some of the ideas used in Halmos' proof reappeared many years later in Halmos' own work on quasi-triangular operators.

Other applications
Other results were received along the line of reinterpreting or reproving previously known results. Of particular interest is Teturo Kamae's proof of the individual ergodic theorem or L. van den Dries and Alex Wilkie's treatment of Gromov's theorem on groups of polynomial growth. Nonstandard analysis was used by Larry Manevitz and Shmuel Weinberger to prove a result in algebraic topology.

The real contributions of nonstandard analysis lie however in the concepts and theorems that utilize the new extended language of nonstandard set theory. Among the list of new applications in mathematics there are new approaches to probability,
hydrodynamics, measure theory, nonsmooth and harmonic analysis, etc.

There are also applications of nonstandard analysis to the theory of stochastic processes, particularly constructions of Brownian motion as random walks. Albeverio et al. have an excellent introduction to this area of research.

Applications to calculus
As an application to mathematical education, H. Jerome Keisler wrote Elementary Calculus: An Infinitesimal Approach. Covering nonstandard calculus, it develops differential and integral calculus using the hyperreal numbers, which include infinitesimal elements. These applications of nonstandard analysis depend on the existence of the standard part of a finite hyperreal . One of the visualization devices Keisler uses is that of an imaginary infinite-magnification microscope to distinguish points infinitely close together. Keisler's book is now out of print, but is freely available from his website; see references below.

Critique

Despite the elegance and appeal of some aspects of nonstandard analysis, criticisms have been voiced, as well, such as those by Errett Bishop, Alain Connes, and Paul Halmos, as documented at criticism of nonstandard analysis.

Logical framework
Given any set , the superstructure over a set  is the set  defined by the conditions

The superstructure over the real numbers includes a wealth of mathematical structures: For instance, it contains isomorphic copies of all separable metric spaces and metrizable topological vector spaces. Virtually all of mathematics that interests an analyst goes on within .

The working view of nonstandard analysis is a set  and a mapping  that satisfies some additional properties. To formulate these principles we first state some definitions.

A formula has bounded quantification if and only if the only quantifiers that occur in the formula have range restricted over sets, that is are all of the form:

For example, the formula

On the other hand,

does not have bounded quantification because the quantification of y is unrestricted.

Internal sets

We now formulate the basic logical framework of nonstandard analysis:

 Countable saturation: If {Ak}k ∈ N is a decreasing sequence of nonempty internal sets, with k ranging over the natural numbers, then

One can show using ultraproducts that such a map * exists.

First consequences
The symbol  denotes the nonstandard natural numbers. The set  is nonempty. To see this, apply countable saturation to the sequence of internal sets

The sequence  has a nonempty intersection, proving the result.

We begin with some definitions: Hyperreals r, s are infinitely close if and only if

A hyperreal  is infinitesimal if and only if it is infinitely close to 0. A hyperreal  is limited (or finite) if and only if its absolute value is dominated by (less than) a standard integer. The limited hyperreals form a subring of  containing the reals. In this ring, the infinitesimal hyperreals are an ideal.

For example, any line passing through the point  on the -axis and having infinitesimal slope is parallel to the -axis.

Theorem.

The mapping st is also external.

One intuitive characterization of continuity is as follows:

Theorem. A real-valued function  on the interval  is continuous if and only if for every hyperreal  in the interval , we have: .

(see microcontinuity for more details). Similarly,

Theorem. A real-valued function  is differentiable at the real value  if and only if for every infinitesimal hyperreal number , the value

-saturation
It is possible to "improve" the saturation by allowing collections of higher cardinality to be intersected.

This is useful, for instance, in a topological space , where we may want -saturation to ensure the intersection of a standard neighborhood base is nonempty.

For any cardinal , a -saturated extension can be constructed.

See also

 Overspill
 Nonstandard calculus
 Transfer principle
 Internal set theory
 Elementary Calculus: An Infinitesimal Approach
 Hyperreal number
 Hyperinteger
 Infinitesimal
 Surreal number
 Non-classical analysis
 Smooth infinitesimal analysis
 Criticism of nonstandard analysis
 Influence of nonstandard analysis
 Hyperfinite set
 Constructive nonstandard analysis
 Calculus Made Easy

Further reading
 E. E. Rosinger, [math/0407178]. Short introduction to Nonstandard Analysis. arxiv.org.

References

Bibliography

 Crowell, Calculus. A text using infinitesimals.
 Robert Goldblatt (1998) Lectures on the Hyperreals. An introduction to nonstandard analysis. Graduate Texts in Mathematics, 188. Springer-Verlag 
 Hermoso, Nonstandard Analysis and the Hyperreals. A gentle introduction.
 Hurd, A.E. and Loeb, P.A.: An introduction to nonstandard real analysis, London, Academic Press, 1985. 
 Keisler, H. Jerome Elementary Calculus: An Approach Using Infinitesimals. Includes an axiomatic treatment of the hyperreals, and is freely available under a Creative Commons license
 Keisler, H. Jerome: An Infinitesimal Approach to Stochastic Analysis, vol. 297 of Memoirs of the American Mathematical Society, 1984.
 Naranong S., Nonstandard Analysis from a Model-Theoretic Perspective. A streamlined introduction in the spirit of Robinson.
 Robinson, A. Nonstandard analysis. Nederl. Akad. Wetensch. Proc. Ser. A 64 = Indag. Math.  23  (1961) 432–440.
 Robert, A. Nonstandard analysis, Wiley, New York 1988. 
 Skolem, Th. (1934) "Über die Nicht-charakterisierbarkeit der Zahlenreihe mittels endlich oder abzählbar unendlich vieler Aussagen mit ausschliesslich Zahlenvariablen", Fundamenta Mathematicae 23: 150–161.
 Stroyan, K. A Brief Introduction to Infinitesimal Calculus
 Gordon E., Kusraev A., and Kutateladze S. Infinitesimal Analysis
 Tao, T. An epsilon of room, II. Pages from year three of a mathematical blog. American Mathematical Society, Providence, RI, 2010 (pp. 209–229).

External links
 
 The Ghosts of Departed Quantities by Lindsay Keegan.

 
Real closed field
Infinity